Albert William Hillestad (July 11, 1924 – June 14, 2007) was an Episcopal priest and bishop of the Episcopal Diocese of Springfield from 1972 to 1981.

Early and family life
Born on July 11, 1924, in New Richmond, Wisconsin to Evar and Eleanora Hillestad. Albert Hillestad graduated from the University of Wisconsin in 1947 and three years later from the Seabury-Western Theological Seminary.
He married (and ultimately survived) Carol J. Hillestad, with whom he had seven children who survived their parents.

Ministry
Ordained to the diaconate in April 1950 and priesthood on in October 1950, Hillestad served as an assistant at Christ Church in La Crosse, Wisconsin from 1950 to 1951, then at the Church of the Ascension in Chicago from 1951 to 1957. He then returned to Wisconsin to serve as vicar of St. Mark's church in Oconto, Wisconsin (1957–64) before moving to the Episcopal Diocese of Springfield, where he accepted a call to serve at St. Andrew's Church in Carbondale, Illinois (1964–1972).
 
Hillestad was selected as the diocese's bishop coadjutor, and Presiding bishop John E. Hines led the consecration on February 19, 1972, joined by Springfield's bishop Albert A. Chambers (who would shortly leave the Anglican Communion due to his opposition to the ordination of woman as priests) and bishop Frederick B. Wolf of Maine. Bishop Hillestad took office as the diocese's eighth bishop on September 24, 1972. Rt.Rev. Hillestad submitted his resignation from his see in 1980, citing health reasons. The diocese selected Donald M. Hultstrand as his successor.

In retirement Hillestad served at the Easter Seals Rehabilitation Center in Mobile, Alabama, before moving in 1989 to San Miguel de Allende, Mexico, where he continued to volunteer his time serving handicapped children at the Centro de Crecimiento.

Death and legacy
Bishop Hillestad died in San Miguel de Allende, survived by seven children and numerous grandchildren on June 14, 2007. The Cathedral of Saints Peter and Paul in Springfield, Illinois has a memorial plaque in its courtyard commemorating him and his wife Carol (1925–1978).

See also 
List of bishops of the Episcopal Church in the United States of America

References

External links 
History of the Church of the Ascension, Chicago, Illinois 1857–1982

People from New Richmond, Wisconsin
1924 births
2007 deaths
People from Springfield, Illinois
University of Wisconsin–Madison alumni
20th-century Anglican bishops in the United States
American expatriates in Mexico
Episcopal bishops of Springfield